Hesperotettix is a genus of spur-throated grasshoppers in the family Acrididae. There are about 9 described species in Hesperotettix.

Species
 Hesperotettix coloradensis Bruner, 1904
 Hesperotettix curtipennis Scudder, 1897
 Hesperotettix floridensis Morse, 1901 (Florida purple-striped grasshopper)
 Hesperotettix gemmicula Hebard, 1918
 Hesperotettix nevadensis Morse, 1906
 Hesperotettix osceola Hebard, 1918 (osceola grasshopper)
 Hesperotettix pacificus Scudder, 1897
 Hesperotettix speciosus (Scudder, 1872) (showy grasshopper)
 Hesperotettix viridis (Thomas, 1872) (snakeweed grasshopper)

References

Further reading

 
 

Melanoplinae